Breckinridge may refer to:

People
 Breckinridge (surname)
 Breckinridge family
 Marvin Breckinridge Patterson (1905–2002), American photojournalist, cinematographer, and philanthropist
 Benjamin Breckinridge Warfield (1851–1921), principal of Princeton Seminary from 1887 to 1921
 Breckinridge Long (1881–1958), United States ambassador to Italy
 Bobby Breckinridge, fictional character in Degrassi
 John Breckinridge Castleman (1841–1918), military officer and prominent landowner and businessman in Louisville, Kentucky
 John C. Breckinridge (1821-1875), senator from Kentucky, fourteenth Vice President of the United States, and later Confederate general and the last Confederate Secretary of War
 Robert Breckinridge McAfee (1784–1849), Kentucky politician, and seventh Lieutenant Governor of Kentucky
 James Breckenridge Speed (1844–1912), businessman and philanthropist in Louisville, Kentucky

Places
In the United States:
 Breckenridge, Colorado, originally spelled "Breckinridge", renamed during the Civil War
 Breckinridge County, Kentucky
 Breckinridge Center, Kentucky

Things
 Breckinridge House, a dormitory at the University of Chicago named for Sophonisba Breckinridge
 Myra Breckinridge, a satirical novel by Gore Vidal written in the form of a diary
 Myra Breckinridge (film), cinematic version of Vidal's novel
 USS Breckinridge (DD-148), a Wickes class destroyer in the United States Navy, named for Joseph Breckinridge

See also
Brackenridge (disambiguation)
Breckenridge (disambiguation)